Kashira Power Plant is a coal-fired power plant at Kashira in Moscow Oblast, Russia. Its first unit was commissioned in 1922 with a power capacity of 12 MW. Double units 1 and 2 have capacity of 300 MW, and single units 4, 5 have capacity of 300 MW each, unit 6 has capacity of 330 MW. In addition, unit 7 has thermal capacity of 80 MW.

In 1951 a HVDC link with 30 MW built from the components of Elbe-Project to Moscow was built. However it is not in service any more. The power plant has an interesting feature as one of its two main chimneys serves as electricity pylon.

See also

 List of power stations in Russia

References

External links
 Inter RAO
 Plant description

Coal-fired power stations in Russia
Power stations built in the Soviet Union